Micromyrtus blakelyi is a spreading shrub in the myrtle family. It is found near the Hawkesbury River, north of Sydney. It usually grows in depressions and crevices in Hawkesbury Sandstone. The shrub grows to a height of 0.3 to 0.6 metres, and has a cushion-like appearance. Flowering occurs from August to October (early Spring). It is a rare plant, listed in New South Wales as vulnerable. The shrub was first collected by botanists in 1958, and it was named in honour of William Faris Blakely.

References

Myrtales of Australia
blakelyi
Flora of New South Wales